These are the official results of the Men's 1500 metres event at the 1990 European Championships in Split, Yugoslavia, held at Stadion Poljud on 30 August and 1 September 1990.

Medalists

Final

Heats

†: Peter Elliott from the United Kingdom fell after having been pushed by East German Hauke Fuhlbrügge and did not finish the race. The East German was disqualified. After protests of the British officials, Elliott was admitted to run in the final. The decision was a  precedent case and not without controversy.

Participation
According to an unofficial count, 27 athletes from 15 countries participated in the event.

 (2)
 (1)
 (2)
 (2)
 (1)
 (3)
 (2)
 (2)
 (1)
 (1)
 (3)
 (2)
 (3)
 (1)
 (1)

See also
 1988 Men's Olympic 1500 metres (Seoul)
 1991 Men's World Championships 1500 metres (Tokyo)
 1992 Men's Olympic 1500 metres (Barcelona)

References

 Results

1500
1500 metres at the European Athletics Championships